José Manuel Youshimatz  (born 10 May 1962) is a Mexican former track cyclist and road bicycle racer who represented his national country at the 1984 Summer Olympics in Los Angeles, California. There he won the bronze medal in the men's points race behind Belgium's Roger Ilegems and West Germany's Uwe Messerschmidt. He competed in three consecutive Summer Olympics, starting in 1984.

References

External links
 databaseOlympics

1962 births
Living people
Mexican people of French descent
Mexican male cyclists
Sportspeople from Puebla
People from Puebla (city)
Cyclists at the 1984 Summer Olympics
Cyclists at the 1988 Summer Olympics
Cyclists at the 1992 Summer Olympics
Cyclists at the 1987 Pan American Games
Olympic cyclists of Mexico
Olympic bronze medalists for Mexico
Olympic medalists in cycling
Medalists at the 1984 Summer Olympics
Pan American Games silver medalists for Mexico
Pan American Games medalists in cycling
Medalists at the 1987 Pan American Games